The Great Western Railway purchased two diesel shunters, and ordered a further seven immediately prior to Nationalisation, which were delivered to British Rail in 1948–49. The two shunters used by the GWR were numbered 1 and 2, while a series commencing at 501 was planned for the new locomotives ordered in the 1940s. British Rail numbered 2 and the new locomotives in a series commencing at 15100.

1 
This locomotive was built by Fowler in 1933 and was used at Swindon Works. It was very similar to the London, Midland and Scottish Railway's departmental locomotive number 2, which was built a couple of years later. It was withdrawn in 1940 and sold to the Ministry of Supply.

2 / 15100
This locomotive was built by Hawthorn Leslie in 1936 and allocated to Swindon. It was a 0-6-0 diesel electric shunter, very similar to the London Midland and Scottish Railway 7069 class (later British Rail Class D3/6), and with a close family resemblance to the Southern Railway Maunsell 350 hp DMS (SR 1 - SR3). It was renumbered 15100 by British Rail in 1948, withdrawn by them in 1965 and scrapped in early 1966.

 see British Rail Class D3/10

501 / 15107
Brush/Petter 360 bhp

 see British Rail 15107

502-507 / 15101-15106
English Electric 350 bhp

 see British Rail Class D3/11

See also
 LMS diesel shunters
 LNER internal combustion locomotives
 Southern Railway diesels

References

 Diesel Shunters
Diesel locomotives of Great Britain
Standard gauge locomotives of Great Britain